Kiss by Kiss is a song written by Douglas Carr, Pär Lönn, Allan Dennis Rich and Emilia Rydberg, and recorded by Emilia Rydberg on her 2000 album, Emilia. In 2001, the single was released in Sweden.

Emilia Rydberg performed the single at Bingolotto at TV4 on 13 January 2001, which was the first time she performed it at TV.

Track listing
Kiss by Kiss (radio edit)
Kiss by Kiss (instrumental version)

Maxisingle
Kiss by Kiss (radio edit)
Kiss by Kiss (Pierre J:s radio mix)
Kiss by Kiss (Pierre J:s remix)
Kiss by Kiss (Pierre J:s funked up-remix)

Charts

References 

Songs about kissing
1998 songs
1999 singles
Emilia Rydberg songs
English-language Swedish songs
Songs written by Emilia Rydberg
Universal Music Group singles